Symphyotrichum ascendens (formerly Aster ascendens) is a species of flowering plant in the family Asteraceae known by the common names western aster, long-leaved aster, and Rocky Mountain aster.

Description
The stem and leaves are roughly hairy in places.

The inflorescence is an array of many flower heads with many narrow violet to nearly white ray florets around a center of golden disc florets that open July–September. The fruit is a hairy cypsela with a long pappus. S. ascendens is similar to Symphyotrichum chilense, which has smaller flower heads.

Chromosomes
Symphyotrichum ascendens has a chromosome base number of x = 13. There are diploid individuals (2n = 26) which occur in the western portion of its range, and tetraploid ones (2n = 52) found eastward.

Taxonomy
S. ascendens is a member of the genus Symphyotrichum, sometimes called American-asters, classified in the subgenus Ascendentes. Its name with author citations is Symphyotrichum ascendens . In 1834, English botanist John Lindley formally described the plant that now is named Symphyotrichum ascendens.

This species is allopolyploid, derived from the hybridization of S. spathulatum (chromosome base number x = 8) with S. falcatum (x = 5), each from a different subgenus, Symphyotrichum and Virgulus, respectively. This produced a plant with a unique base number of x = 13, also written x2 = 13 (8 + 5), and it warranted its own subgenus, Ascendentes, and its own species name. One other species is placed within subgenus Ascendentes: S. defoliatum.

Distribution and habitat

Western aster is native to western North America from British Columbia to Saskatchewan, south to the United States in Montana and North Dakota then south to New Mexico, west to California, north to Washington state, and all states in between.

Citations

References

External links

BONAP distribution map, Biota of North America Program, 2014 

ascendens
Flora of Western Canada
Flora of the Northwestern United States
Flora of the Southwestern United States
Flora of North Dakota
Flora of New Mexico
Flora of the Sierra Nevada (United States)
~
~
Plants described in 1834
Taxa named by John Lindley